Totally Accurate Battlegrounds (TABG) is a multiplayer battle royale video game developed by Swedish studio Landfall Games, and a spin-off of Totally Accurate Battle Simulator (TABS). Similarly to how TABS parodies the battle simulator genre of video games, TABG is a parody of the battle royale genre, primarily titles such as PlayerUnknown's Battlegrounds and Fortnite, and features exaggerated player and weapon physics. The game was released on Steam on June 5, 2018.

Gameplay 
The game plays similarly to other games in the battle royale genre, in which players must traverse a shrinking safe area, collecting equipment such as weapons to fight and eliminate opponents, and aim to be the last remaining player. However, the game is differentiated by a physics engine which produces exaggerated character motions when moving or using weapons (including stretching limbs and exaggerated knockback when using guns), as well as the ability to dual-wield weapons, and platforms with flowing lava.

Release 
Totally Accurate Battlegrounds was originally intended to be released on April 1, 2018 as an April Fool's Day joke, serving as a spin-off of its previous game Totally Accurate Battle Simulator. However, its release was delayed to June 5, in order to address server problems with the game. Landfall stated that the game would be available for free for 100 hours after its release on Steam, after which it would cost $5. On April 1, 2021, the game became free to play.

In March 2020, Landfall announced that they would slowly begin to develop TABG again, but clarified that they were still working full time on Totally Accurate Battle Simulator. In the announcement, they showed off several screenshots of the new map in development. On April 6, 2020, Landfall released a beta version featuring the new map. In the following months, they released multiple temporary betas showcasing improvements to the map, new weapons, new vehicles, and performance optimizations. In April 2021, the game became free-to-play. In February 2022, Landfall Games announced that they have stopped developing further updates for the game as the player base have significantly dwindled.

Reception 
Kotaku felt that Totally Accurate Battlegrounds was both a parody of and homage to the genre, describing the average match as beginning with "madcap rushes of wacky, wavy-arm-flailing players who scramble for weapons or just flat-out slapfight each other to death", and that its "haphazard" combat "manages to make each new encounter feel surprising and high-stakes". Rock Paper Shotgun noted that despite "wacky physics" being a "tired joke", the game did provide several unique features over other games in the genre, including dual-wielding of guns, a rapidly-constructing wall to serve as the barrier for the safe area rather than an encroaching "storm", as well as not depending on microtransactions to obtain cosmetic player skins. However, it was noted that matchmaking times for games were slow due to its smaller player population in comparison to Fortnite and PlayerUnknown's Battlegrounds. As of August 2018, the game was the 18th most popular game on Steam, with over 27,000 players.

References

External links 
 

2018 video games
Battle royale games
First-person shooters
Multiplayer video games
Open-world video games
Parody video games
Tactical shooter video games
Video games developed in Sweden
Windows games
Windows-only games
Satirical video games
Swedish satire